Quyllurqucha (Quechua for "star lake") may refer to:
 Quylluqucha or Quyllurqucha, a lake in Junín Region, Peru
 Quyllurqucha (Ancash), a lake in Ancash Region, Peru
 Quyllurqucha (Huaylas), a mountain in Huaylas, Peru
 Quyllurqucha (Lima), a lake in Lima Region, Peru